Gaîté is a station on line Line 13 of the Paris Métro in the 14th arrondissement.

The station opened on 21 January 1937 as part of the original line 14 between Bienvenüe and Porte de Vanves. This line became part of line 13 on 9 November 1976.
The station is named after the Rue de la Gaîté, which was a country road connecting Clamart with the Barrière du Montparnasse, a gate in the Wall of the Farmers-General at the intersection of the Boulevard Edgar-Quinet and the Rue du Montparnasse (the location of Edgar Quinet station), built between 1784 and 1791 by the Ferme générale, the corporation of tax farmers, to enforce the collection of taxes of goods, including wine, imported into Paris. Guinguettes, restaurants and theatres were built outside the wall, so they could avoid these taxes. "Gaîté" is an old French spelling of "gaiety", reflecting this trade.

In 2021, the station was renamed „Gaîté - Joséphine Baker“ after American-born French dancer, singer, actress and World War II spy Joséphine Baker.

Station layout

Gallery

References

Roland, Gérard (2003). Stations de métro. D’Abbesses à Wagram. Éditions Bonneton.

Paris Métro stations in the 14th arrondissement of Paris
Railway stations in France opened in 1937